The 2012 Women's Junior Pan-Am Championship was the 7th edition of the Women's Pan American Junior Championship. It was held from 10 – 23 September 2012 in Guadalajara, Mexico.

The tournament served as a qualifier for the 2013 Women's Hockey Junior World Cup, held in Mönchengladbach, Germany in July/August 2013.

Argentina won the tournament for the 6th time, defeating Canada 2–1 in the final. The United States won the bronze medal by defeating Chile 2–1 in the third and fourth place playoff.

Officials
The following are the umpires appointed by the Pan American Hockey Federation to officiate the tournament.

 Mercedes Sanchez (ARG)
 Luciana Suarez (ARG)
 Victoria Villafañe (ARG)
 Emma Simmons (BER)
 Megan Robertson (CAN)
 Camila Cabargas (CHI)
 Arely Castellanos (MEX)
 Catalina Montesino Wenzel (MEX)
 Ana K. Vasquez Escalante (MEX)
 Amber Church (NZL)
 Lisa Marcano (TTO)
 Ayanna McClean (TTO)
 Mary Driscoll (USA)
 Suzzie Sutton (USA)
 Mercedes Coates (URU)

Participating nations

 
 
 
 
 
  (host nation)

Results

Preliminary round

Pool A

Pool B

Classification round

Ninth to eleventh place classification

Crossover

Ninth and tenth place

Fifth to eighth place classification

Crossover

Seventh and eighth place

Fifth and sixth place

First to fourth place classification

Semi-finals

Third and fourth place

Final

Statistics

Final standings

Goalscorers

References

Women's Pan-Am Junior Championship
Pan American Junior Championship
International women's field hockey competitions hosted by Mexico
Pan American Junior Championship
Pan American Junior Championship
Sport in Guadalajara, Jalisco
21st century in Guadalajara, Jalisco
Pan American Championship